Ronald Andrew Necciai [neh-chai], (born June 18, 1932 in Gallatin, Pennsylvania), is a former Major League Baseball starting pitcher who played with the Pittsburgh Pirates in the 1952 season. He batted and threw right-handed.

Necciai is best remembered for the unique feat of striking out 27 batters in a nine-inning game, which he accomplished while playing with the Class-D Appalachian League team, the Bristol Twins, on May 13, 1952. He is the only pitcher ever to do so in a nine-inning, professional-league game.

Minor League career
Necciai pitched two seasons of Class-D baseball before being drafted in the Pirates' farm system in 1952 at age 19. He was assigned to pitch for the Bristol Twins, the Pirates' Appalachian League team. On May 13, pitching despite painful stomach ulcers, Necciai struck out 27 batters while throwing a 7–0 no-hitter against the Welch Miners. Four of the Welch hitters did reach base, one runner each via a walk, an error, a hit batsman and a passed ball charged to Twins' catcher Harry Dunlop on a swinging third strike. This resulted in a four-strikeout ninth inning. Only two batters put the ball in play: Robert Ganung grounded out to first base in the fourth inning, while Frank Whitehead got on base on an error in the ninth.

In his next start, Necciai threw a 24-strikeout two-hitter. 

In that season he struck out 109 hitters in 43 innings with Bristol, and a Carolina League-high 172 in 126 innings at Burlington before quickly climbing the ranks of the organization and eventually getting called up to the Major Leagues amid heavy publicity in August 1952.

Major League career
At 20 years old, Necciai posted a 1–6 record with 31 strikeouts and a 7.08 ERA in 54 innings pitched from August 10 to September 28, 1952, the single season comprising his entire Major League Baseball career.

Later years
Necciai served a brief stint in the United States Army in 1953 before being released on a medical discharge. He returned to baseball thereafter, but was plagued by injuries resulting from his long-standing battle with stomach ulcers and further debilitation from a torn rotator cuff. He spent the years between 1953 and 1955 in various lower levels of professional baseball, but was ultimately unable to overcome injuries. He later began a successful career in the sporting goods industry.

See also

List of Major League Baseball pitchers with 18 strikeouts in one game

References
In-line citations

Further reading
Dennis Snelling: A Glimpse of Fame, McFarland & Company, Jefferson N.C., 1993, pp. 135–149

External links

The Man Who Struck Out Everybody (article)
(profile) Baseball Library

1932 births
Living people
Baseball players from Pennsylvania
Bristol Twins players
Burlington-Graham Pirates players
Hollywood Stars players
Major League Baseball pitchers
New Orleans Pelicans (baseball) players
People from Monongahela, Pennsylvania
Pittsburgh Pirates players
Salisbury Pirates players
Shelby Farmers players
Waco Pirates players